Westfield Washington Township is one of nine townships in Hamilton County, Indiana, United States. As of the 2010 census, its population was 32,884 and it contained 12,477 housing units. In 2007, the township had 29,361 residents. Due to Clay Township (neighboring to the south) becoming more conservative with development due to a reduction in available land over the past few years, Westfield Washington Township has seen an increase in residential communities being developed.

History
Washington Township was organized in 1833. In 2018, the Hamilton County Board of Commissioners ordered that Washington Township officially change its name to Westfield Washington Township, effective November 10, 2018.

Geography
The streams of Bear Creek, Cool Creek, Finley Creek, Grassy Branch, Jones Ditch, Kreager Ditch, Little Eagle Creek, and Woodruff Branch run through this township.

Cities and towns
 Westfield

Unincorporated communities
 Eagletown
 Hortonville
 Lamong

(This list is based on USGS data and may include former settlements.)

Adjacent townships
 Adams Township (north)
 Jackson Township (northeast)
 Noblesville Township (east)
 Clay Township (south)
 Eagle Township, Boone County (southwest)
 Union Township, Boone County (west)
 Marion Township, Boone County (northwest)

Cemeteries
The township contains twelve cemeteries: Anti-Slavery Friends, Chester, Eagletown, Greenwood, Hammack, Little Eagle Creek, Memorial Park, Pleasant View, Sugar Grove, Summit Lawn, Summit Lawn and Thomas And Moore.

Major highways
 U.S. Route 31
 State Road 32
 State Road 38

Airports and landing strips
 Helicopter Airways of Indiana
 Pace Airport
 Wilderness Field

Education
Westfield Washington Township residents may obtain a free library card from Westfield Washington Public Library in Westfield.

References
 U.S. Board on Geographic Names (GNIS)
 United States Census Bureau cartographic boundary files

External links
 Indiana Township Association
 United Township Association of Indiana

Townships in Hamilton County, Indiana
Townships in Indiana